Glumač is a village in the municipality of Požega, western Serbia. According to the 2011 census, the village has a population of 684 inhabitants.

References

Populated places in Zlatibor District